is a town located in Yoshino District, Nara Prefecture, Japan.

Geography

The town of Yoshino is located in the northern portion of Yoshino District. Most of the area is mountainous, but the section along the Yoshino River is somewhat flatter and contains most of the town's roads, train tracks and houses.
 Mountains: Yoshino Mountain
 Rivers: Yoshino River
 Lakes: Lake Tsuburo

The most well-known area within the town is Yoshino Mountain, famous for its many thousands of sakura trees; much poetry has been written on the subject by several famous authors, including Chiyo and Uejima Onitsura. These flowering cherry trees were planted in four groves at different altitudes, in part so that the trees would be visible coming into bloom at different times in the spring. An account of Yoshino written in about 1714 explained that, on their climb to the top, travelers would be able to enjoy the lower 1,000 cherry trees at the base, the middle 1,000 on the way, the upper 1,000 toward the top, and the 1,000 in the precincts of the inner shrine at the top.<ref> Kaibara Ekiken. (1714). Yoshinoyama syokeizu ; Stokes, Henry Scott. [https://www.nytimes.com/1983/03/06/travel/cherry-blossom-time-puts-japan-at-ease.html?&pagewanted=2  Cherry Blossom Time Puts Japan at Ease,"] New York Times. March 6, 1983.</ref>

Sacred For adherents of Shugendo, Yoshino Mountain is the traditional beginning of the Mount Ōmine pilgrimage trail (part of the Omine-Okugake Trail), although nowadays many hikers begin and end their trek in the Dorogawa district of Tenkawa Village.

 Industry 

 Lumber 
The town of Yoshino produces a wide variety of wood-based goods made from lumber harvested from the local forest land. Most of the forest within the Yoshino area is artificial, consisting of red cedar and cypress trees that have been planted and harvested in cycles for 500 years. The Yoshino River served in past times as a means of transportation for the lumber harvested in the region.

 Paper 
The Kuzu district of Yoshino has a long history of traditional Japanese washi'' paper production. According to a local story, Prince Oama (later to become Emperor Tenmu), taught the residents of Kuzu the process of making washi in the 7th century.

Surrounding municipalities

 Nara Prefecture
 Asuka
 Sakurai
 Higashiyoshino
 Kawakami
 Kurotaki
 Shimoichi
 Ōyodo
 Uda

Notable places

 Yoshino-Kumano National Park
Yoshino Mountain
 Yoshino Shrine
 Miyataki (district)
 Kinpusen-ji
 Yoshimizu Shrine
 Sakuramotobō
 Yoshinomikumari Shrine
 Nyoirin-ji
Sakuragi Shrine
Ryumon-no-taki (waterfall)
Takataki (waterfall)
Kinpu Shrine
Saigyo-an Hermitage

References

External links
 Yoshino official website 
 Kansai Digital Archives ...Images of Yoshino-cho
 National Archives of Japan  Yoshinoyama syokeizu, illustrated scroll describing Mt. Yoshino, text by Kaibara Ekiken (circa 1714)
 Japan-guide.com Yoshino at Japan Guide
 
 
Nyoirin-ji official website (in Japanese) 

 
Hanami spots of Japan
Shinbutsu shūgō